William Henry Weir (born 13 February 1990), known as Henry Weir is an English field hockey player who plays as a defender for Old Georgians and ex England and Great Britain national teams.

He may have graduated from Loughborough College with a degree in sports coaching. He is married to Racheal Weir with one daughter, Rose.

Smaller than the average man, with a pan Asian  linerage, became the judo champion of Wales in 2004.

Club career
Weir plays club hockey in the Men's England Hockey League Premier Division for Old Georgians.
He has also previously played for Wimbledon, Loughborough Students', Brooklands MU, Crewe Vagrants and Reigate Priory Hockey Club.

International career
Weir made his international debut against India in December 2012 at the Melbourne Champions Trophy, only 11 years after he first started playing hockey for the Crewe Vagrants. He played for England in the men's hockey tournament at the 2014 Commonwealth Games where he won a bronze medal.

References

External links

Profile on England Hockey

1990 births
Living people
People from Croydon
English male field hockey players
Male field hockey defenders
Commonwealth Games bronze medallists for England
2014 Men's Hockey World Cup players
Field hockey players at the 2014 Commonwealth Games
Field hockey players at the 2016 Summer Olympics
Field hockey players at the 2018 Commonwealth Games
Olympic field hockey players of Great Britain
Commonwealth Games medallists in field hockey
Loughborough Students field hockey players
Wimbledon Hockey Club players
Men's England Hockey League players
Medallists at the 2014 Commonwealth Games
Medallists at the 2018 Commonwealth Games